František Pokorný (born 4 June 1905, date of death unknown) was a Czech sports shooter. He competed in two events at the 1936 Summer Olympics.

References

1905 births
Year of death missing
Czech male sport shooters
Olympic shooters of Czechoslovakia
Shooters at the 1936 Summer Olympics
Place of birth missing